This is a list of the Regionally Important Geological/Geomorphological Sites (RIGS) in Suffolk.

There are 8 of these sites, all administered by GeoSuffolk.
 Dunwich Cliff
 Dunwich Heath Cliff
 Cavenham Heath
 Sudbury Railway Pit
 Bugg's Hole Fen, Thelnetham
 Needham Lake
 Calke Wood
 Holywells Park, Ipswich

References

Suffolk-related lists
Regionally Important Geological/Geomorphological Sites (RIGS) in Suffolk
Geology of East of England